The Berlin Project was an American punk rock band from just outside Pittsburgh, Pennsylvania, United States, with influences from the punk, and ska (early years) music scenes that was active from 1995 to 2005. The band took its name from a computer program.

In those ten years the band toured North America, sharing the stage with various bands such as the Matches, Steel Train, Punchline, the Sloppy Meateaters, The Unsung Zeros, the Juliana Theory, Midtown, River City High, Catch 22 and Clearview Kills. The band played side stages during the 2002 and 2003 Van's Warped Tour. The Berlin Project was also a part of numerous Radio Festivals and the like such as 2000's X-Fest in Pittsburgh with Stone Temple Pilots and Everclear, and 2002's Skate and Surf Festival in Asbury Park, New Jersey, with the Descendents and more.

The Berlin Project released two albums on US indie label Orange Peal records. The band's final album, The Things We Say, was released to some success on Trident Style Recordings in Japan. In 1997 the band covered Snoop Dogg's "Gin and Juice".

In August 2009, the band temporarily reformed with John Garrighan, Chuck Rocha, Paul Menotiades (Punchline, the Composure), Cory Muro (the Composure) to perform four concerts in Pennsylvania, Ohio, and Maryland. Some of these shows were headlining dates with support from the Composure and some were in support of also regrouped the Ataris.

Founding member John Garrighan died of a heroin overdose in January 2011.

The Berlin Project reunited for one performance on July 8, 2017, at Mr. Smalls in Millvale, Pennsylvania, as the main support act for Punchline's 20th Anniversary Show. The band played songs from their entire discography. Returning members included Jon Belan, Bradley (Brad Evanovich), Brian Camp, Nick Revak, Aaron Mediate, Sean McAfee, Bryan Coles, and Michael "Nacho" Crosby. Dan Garrighan filled in for his brother on guitar and vocals.

Discography

Studio albums
1998: Running For the Border
1999: Culture Clash 
2004: The Things We Say

EPs
2000: The Transition Radio EP

Band members
John Garrighan (lead vocals, lead guitar): 1995–2005, died in 2011.
Jon Belan (lead vocals, rhythm guitar): 2002–2005
Nick Revak (drums): 1999–2005
Aaron Mediate (keyboards, saxophone): 1997–2005
Tim Schultz (bass, backing vocals): 2003–2005
Chuck Rocha (bass/vocals) : 2002–2003, 2009
Bradley (Brad Evanovich) (bass/vocals) : 1995–2002
Brian Camp (guitar/vocals) : 1995–2002
Michael "Nacho" Crosby (alto sax/vocals) : 1998–2000
Sean McAfee (keyboards/trombone) : 1998–2000
Bryan Coles (trumpet) : 2000
Joe Rothwell (drums) : 1995–1999
Eric Porado (trumpet) :  1997–1999
Joe Culig (trombone) : 1997–1999
Touring
Paul Menotiades (guitar/vocals) : 2009
Cory Muro (drums) : 2009

References

External links
BERLIN PROJECT Lyrics, Songs & Albums | eLyrics.net

Yahoo Music's Bio
The / Transition / Radio / EP by The Berlin Project
Culture Clash by Berlin Project
The Things We Say by The Berlin Project

American ska punk musical groups
Punk rock groups from Pennsylvania
Musical groups from Pittsburgh
Musical groups established in 1995
Musical groups disestablished in 2005
Musical groups reestablished in 2009